

Point Souttar is a locality in the Australian state of  South Australia located on the western side of Yorke Peninsula on the portion forming the south coast of Hardwicke Bay in Spencer Gulf about  west of the Adelaide city centre.

Its boundaries were created in May 1999 for the “long established name” which includes the Point Souttar Shack Site.  The name was derived from a headland on the coastline which was named after a John Souttar who married Joanna Daly, the daughter of Dominick Daly, the seventh Governor of South Australia.

As of 2015, the majority of land use within the locality is destined for agriculture.  A secondary land use is conservation which concerns the strip of land immediately adjoining the coastline as well as part of the Leven Beach Conservation Park located in the locality's northwest corner.

Point Souttar is located within the federal division of Grey, the state electoral district of Narungga and the local government area of the Yorke Peninsula Council.

References

Towns in South Australia
Yorke Peninsula
Spencer Gulf